Sevgi Çağal, born on February 17, 1957, in New York City, U.S. is a Turkish painter and sculptor.

Sevgi was educated in French linguistics at the New York University from 1974 to 1978, from where she received a BA degree. In 1976, Çağal studied history of arts in Paris, France. She completed her education with a MA degree in French linguistics and literature at  NYU in 1980.

She moved to Turkey in 1987, and lives since then in İstanbul. Between 1990 and 1998, Çağal worked in some art workshops of her masters. She opened her own workshop in 1997.

Her works are recognized by their round forms and vibrant color. They can be found in collections all over in Europe, USA and parts of Asia. Her latest works are of tulips, abstracted so that they have a life of their own. The previous works consisted of almost magnified detail of organic forms. Detail has always been important to her: she believes the essence of being is hidden in the detail and tulips, rather the form of the tulip, to her consists of the folds and the forms we may find in all living things.

References

1957 births
Living people
American people of Turkish descent
American emigrants to Turkey
Turkish women painters
Turkish women sculptors
Artists from New York City
New York University alumni
21st-century Turkish sculptors
20th-century Turkish women artists
21st-century Turkish women artists